John Daniel Couriel (born March 23, 1978) is a justice of the Supreme Court of Florida.

Education and legal career

Couriel received a Bachelor of Arts from Harvard College, and a Juris Doctor from Harvard Law School. He began his legal career as a law clerk to Judge John D. Bates of the United States District Court for the District of Columbia. He served as an Assistant United States Attorney for the Southern District of Florida, and was a partner at Kobre & Kim in Miami before being appointed to the bench.

Couriel previously interviewed to become United States Attorney for the Southern District of Florida and to serve as a federal district judge for the Southern District of Florida. He unsuccessfully ran for the Florida Senate's 35th District in 2012 where he lost to incumbent Democrat Gwen Margolis 62-38%, and for the Florida House of Representatives' 114th District in 2016, this time narrowly losing to Democrat Daisy Baez 51-49%.

Florida Supreme Court 

On May 26, 2020, Governor of Florida Ron DeSantis announced his appointment of Couriel to serve as a justice of the Supreme Court of Florida.

References

External links 
 

1978 births
Living people
21st-century American lawyers
21st-century American judges
Assistant United States Attorneys
Federalist Society members
Florida lawyers
Florida Republicans
Justices of the Florida Supreme Court
Harvard College alumni
Harvard Law School alumni
Lawyers from Miami